Women's javelin throw events for athletes with cerebral palsy were held at the 2004 Summer Paralympics in the Athens Olympic Stadium. Events were held in two disability classes or ranges, F33/34 being held jointly with F52/53 wheelchair athletes.


F33/34/52/53

F35-38

The F35-38 event was won by Renata Chilewska, representing .

21 September 2004, 09:00

References

W
2004 in women's athletics